Rushoon is a town located north east of Marystown, Newfoundland and Labrador on the Burin Peninsula of Newfoundland and Labrador. The post office was established there in 1955 and the first postmaster was Ambrose Joseph Miller. It became a Local Government Community on January 18, 1966.

Demographics 

References 

Populated coastal places in Canada
Towns in Newfoundland and Labrador